Jawahar Navodaya Vidyalaya Uttar Dinajpur or locally called as JNV Dalkhola is a boarding, co-educational  school in Uttar Dinajpur district of West Bengal in India. Navodaya Vidyalayas are funded by the Indian Ministry of Human Resources Development and administered  by Navodaya Vidyalaya Smiti, an autonomous body under the ministry.

History 
The school was founded in 2005, and is a part of Jawahar Navodaya Vidyalaya schools. This school is administered and monitored by Patna regional office of Navodaya Vidyalaya Smiti.

Affiliations 
JNV Dalkhola is affiliated to Central Board of Secondary Education with affiliation number 2440009.

See also 

 List of JNV schools
 Jawahar Navodaya Vidyalaya, Dakshin Dinajpur

References

External links 

 Official Website of JNV Uttar Dinajpur

Boarding schools in West Bengal
High schools and secondary schools in West Bengal
Uttar Dinajpur
Schools in Uttar Dinajpur district
Educational institutions established in 2005
2005 establishments in West Bengal